Gray Eagle, Grey Eagle, or Greyeagle may refer to:

Places in the United States
 Grey Eagle, Minnesota, a small city
 Grey Eagle Township, Todd County, Minnesota, the city's township
 Greyeagle, West Virginia, an unincorporated community
 Gray Eagle Creek, a tributary of the Middle Fork Feather River, California
 Gray Eagle Creek, near Graeagle, California

Nickname
 Vermont Garrison (1915–1994), United States Air Force flying ace nicknamed "the Gray Eagle", having flown in combat in World War II, the Korean War and the Vietnam War
 Robert H. Milroy (1816–1890), Union Army general during the American Civil War nicknamed "the Gray Eagle"
 Tris Speaker (1888–1958), American Major League Baseball Hall-of-Fame player nicknamed "the Gray Eagle"

Other uses
 Grey Eagle (sternwheeler), an American sternwheel-driven steamboat in use from 1894 to 1930
 Gray Eagle Award, presented to the US Naval Aviator who has served on continuous active duty the longest
 General Atomics MQ-1C Gray Eagle, an unmanned aerial vehicle used by the United States Army
 Grayeagle, a 1977 American Western film directed Charles B. Pierce
 Gray Eagle, a figure in Haida Gwaii mythology

Lists of people by nickname